Iga Vas is a settlement south of Stari Trg in the Municipality of Loška Dolina in the Inner Carniola region of Slovenia.

Name
The name Iga vas is believed to be connected with the Slovene common noun igo 'yoke', referring to the layout of the village in the 18th century. If so, the name literally means 'yoke village'.

References

External links

Iga Vas on Geopedia

Populated places in the Municipality of Loška Dolina